Elvis Ribarič (born 21 May 1972) is a retired Slovenian football midfielder.

References

1972 births
Living people
Slovenian footballers
FC Koper players
ND Gorica players
NK Primorje players
Association football midfielders
Slovenia international footballers